Argyroeides minuta is a moth of the subfamily Arctiinae. It was described by Herbert Druce in 1888. It is found in Honduras.

References

Moths described in 1888
Argyroeides
Moths of Central America